Mururiini is a settlement in Kenya's Central Province. The distance from Mururiini to  Nairobi is approximately 87 km / 54 mi.

References 

Populated places in Central Province (Kenya)